Focus, or its plural form foci may refer to:

Arts
 Focus or Focus Festival, former name of the Adelaide Fringe arts festival in South Australia

Film 
Focus, a 1962 TV film starring James Whitmore
Focus (2001 film), a 2001 film based on the Arthur Miller novel
Focus (2015 film), a 2015 film about con artists

Music 
 Focus (music), a musical technique also known as modal frame
 Focus..., American music producer
 Focus (band), Dutch progressive rock band

Albums
 Focus (Stan Getz album), 1961 jazz album
 Focus (Bill Hardman album), 1984 jazz album
 Focus (Jan Akkerman & Thijs van Leer album), 1985
 Focus (Cynic album), 1993 metal album
 Focus (Chico Freeman album), 1994 jazz album
 Focus (Souls of Mischief album), 1998 alternative hip-hop album
 Focus (Holly Starr album), 2012 CCM album
 Focus (Arthur Blythe album), 2002 jazz album
 Focus (Diaura album), 2013 Japanese visual kei album

Songs
 "Focus" (Ariana Grande song), 2015
 "Focus" (Bazzi song), 2019
 "Focus" (Craig David song), 2018
 "Focus" (H.E.R. song), 2017
 "Focus" (Jacob Whitesides song), 2016
 "Focus / No Angel", a 2018 single by Charli XCX
 "Focus", a song by Joe Budden
 "Focus", a song by Susumu Hirasawa from Paranoia Agent Original Soundtrack
 "Focus", a song by Kim Dong-han from D-Hours AM 7:03
 "Focus", a song by 10 Years from Division
 "The Focus", by Failure, from The Heart Is a Monster, 2015

Writing 
Focus (encyclopedia), a 1958 Swedish language encyclopedia
Focus (German magazine), a German weekly news magazine
Focus (Italian magazine), an Italian monthly popular science magazine
Focus (Polish magazine), a Polish scientific monthly magazine
Focus (Christian magazine)
Focus (Ukrainian magazine), a national Ukrainian weekly news magazine
Focus Taiwan, of the Central News Agency
Focus (novel), a 1945 novel by Arthur Miller
BBC Focus, a monthly science and technology magazine
Fokus (magazine), a Swedish magazine
San Francisco Focus, a monthly magazine

Companies, brands, organizations 
Anti-Nazi Council, a 1930s organisation operated by a group known as Focus in Defence of Freedom and Peace sometimes called the Focus Group, including Winston Churchill
Focus DIY, a UK chain of do-it-yourself stores
Focus.com, a business social networking platform
Focus Brands, American restaurant franchiser and operator
Focus Features, the art house films division of NBC Universal's Universal Studios
Focus Films, U.K. independent film producer
FOR Organizing Committee of the United States, an American post-Trotskyist group, known as FOCUS
Focus Humanitarian Assistance, an international emergency relief organization
Focus Ireland, Irish nonprofit organization providing services for homeless people
Focus on the Family, an American non-profit organization
Focus Services, an international call center company
Fellowship of Catholic University Students, a Catholic outreach program for American college students founded in 1997
Focus Software, former name of Zemax Development Corporation, a maker of optical design software
Focus Home Interactive, a French publisher of computer games
Families OverComing Under Stress, a stress management program
Focus Bikes, a German bicycle manufacturer
Ford Focus, an international Ford automobile
Focus (board game), an abstract strategy game
Samsung Focus, a smartphone manufactured by Samsung which runs Microsoft Windows Phone
Focus (Croatian political party), a political party in Croatia
The Focus Foundation, an American research and support foundation

Science and technology

Computing and mathematics
Focus (computing), which of a number of GUI elements currently accepts keyboard input
FOCUS, a database reporting program
HP FOCUS, a CPU architecture
Helicon Focus, an image software program
Focus (geometry), a key point in specifying a conic section or other plane curve
Firefox Focus, a privacy-focused browser from Mozilla
Focus number system, a logarithmic number system proposed in 1977

Social sciences
Focus or attention, selectively concentrating on one aspect of the environment while ignoring other things
Focus (linguistics), the way information in one phrase relates to information that has come before
Focus group, a form of qualitative research in which a group of people are asked about their attitude towards a product, service, concept, advertisement, idea, or packaging

Other sciences
 Epileptic focus in epilepsy
Focus (earthquake), an earthquake's underground point of origin or hypocenter
Focus (optics), a point toward which rays are made to converge

Military technology
AGM-87 Focus, a U.S. Navy air-to-surface missile
Operation Focus, the Israeli name for the attack against the Egyptian Air Force in the Six-Day War

Other uses 
Focus mitt, a padded target attached to a glove and usually used in training boxers and other combat athletes
Focus, in Final Fantasy XIII, a task given to L'Cie to grant eternal life upon completion, or the life of a mindless Cieth on failure
Fokus, a Danish political party
Focus (name)
FOCUS Program, a voluntary study program at numerous American universities

See also 
Focus group, a group interviewed to analyse opinions
Focus Group (disambiguation)
Hyperfocus, an intense form of mental concentration on a subject, topic, or task
Strong focusing, a principle in accelerator physics
Focal (disambiguation)
Focused (disambiguation)
Focusing (disambiguation)
Focal point (disambiguation)
Fantasy Focus (disambiguation)